Jose Alberto da Luz (1904-1986) was an international lawn bowler from Hong Kong.

Bowls career
He won a silver medal in the fours at the 1954 British Empire and Commonwealth Games in Vancouver, with Alfred Coates, Robert Gourlay and his brother Raoul da Luz.

Personal life
Of Portuguese origin he was born in Hong Kong and became a US citizen in 1964.

References

1904 births
1988 deaths
Hong Kong emigrants to the United States
Hong Kong male bowls players
Commonwealth Games silver medallists for Hong Kong
Commonwealth Games medallists in lawn bowls
Bowls players at the 1954 British Empire and Commonwealth Games
Medallists at the 1954 British Empire and Commonwealth Games